Comet Beljawsky is also known as 1911 IV and 1911g according to the naming conventions at the time. The comet was discovered by the Russian astronomer Sergei Ivanovich Beljawsky September 29, 1911 and shortly thereafter it was independently seen by four or five other observers in the United States and probably by others throughout the world. At the time it was discovered, the comet was near to the Sun which made observations difficult. However, several days after discovery it was a naked eye object for a few days in the morning sky and later, after perihelion, as an evening object. It faded rapidly, becoming visible only in telescopes and was last seen on February 17, 1912. The comet sported a tail 8 to 10 degrees in length. In mid-October, the comet was visible in the evening sky together with another bright comet,  C/1911 O1 Brooks.

Comet Beljawsky is a long-period (non-periodic) comet noteworthy for having a hyperbolic orbit and so it is not expected to return to the inner Solar System again.

References

Non-periodic comets
19110929